Aeromar Líneas Aéreas Dominicanas (also known as Aeromar Airlines) was an airline based in the Dominican Republic.

History

The airline was founded as Aeromar Cargo in 1962 as an airfreight forwarder and all-cargo carrier. The airline was then established in 1998 as a passenger carrier by Raymundo Polanco Alegria to replace the defunct Dominicana de Aviación. Polanco-Alegria was an Air Force military commander and a key figure in the Rebellion of the Pilots movement in November 1961, when military action was taken by a group of aviators to guarantee the democratic process after the death of the dictator Rafael Leonidas Trujillo

Aeromar services began with a single Boeing 727 leased from Falcon Air Express, for routes to Miami and San Juan. In 2001, it bought a Boeing 747 to a new route to Madrid, but the route was suspended 5 months later due to heavy competition with Iberia. In 2002, new services to New York, In 2003 The Airlines began to fly to Aruba, Havana and Caracas with Boeing 737, 757 and 767. In 2003, the airline ceased operations. Aeromar was the first airline to fly New York– Santiago, DR route in 2002.

Routes
Santo Domingo (SDQ) - New York (JFK)
Santo Domingo (SDQ) - Miami (MIA)
Santo Domingo (SDQ) - San Juan, PR (SJU)
Santo Domingo (SDQ) - Aruba (AUA)
Santo Domingo (SDQ) - Havana (HAV)
Santiago (STI) - New York (JFK)
Santiago (STI) - San Juan, PR (SJU)

Destinations
 New York City (John F. Kennedy International Airport) Hub
 Miami (Miami International Airport) Focus city
 Madrid (Barajas International Airport) Service launched but ended a week later    
 San Juan (Luis Muñoz Marín International Airport) 2002
 Caracas (Simón Bolívar International Airport)
 Havana (José Martí International Airport)
 Aruba (Queen Beatrix International Airport)
 Curaçao (Curaçao International Airport)

Fleet
The Aeromar Líneas Aéreas Dominicanas fleet consists of the following aircraft:

See also
List of defunct airlines of the Dominican Republic

References

Defunct airlines of the Dominican Republic
Airlines established in 1962
Airlines disestablished in 2003